The Washington County School District is a public school district in Washington County, Georgia, United States, based in Sandersville. It serves the communities of Davisboro, Deepstep, Harrison, Oconee, Riddleville, Sandersville, Warthen and Tennille.

Schools
The Washington County School District has three elementary schools, one middle school, and one high school.

Elementary schools
 Ridge Road Elementary School
 Ridge Road Primary School

Middle school
 T.J. Elder Middle School

High school
Washington County High School

References

External links

School districts in Georgia (U.S. state)
Education in Washington County, Georgia